The National Collegiate Cycling Association is a division of USA Cycling and the governing body of collegiate cycling in the US. Its predecessor was the US Collegiate Cycling Association (USCCA), which held the first national collegiate road cycling championships in San Luis Obispo, CA in May 1988. It was hosted by California Polytechnic State University.

NCCA member clubs must be recognized by its school, and each school campus can be represented by only one club.

Constituent conferences are:

ACCC: Atlantic Collegiate Cycling Conference
RMCCC: Rocky Mountain Collegiate Cycling Conference
ECCC: Eastern Collegiate Cycling Conference
SCCCC: South Central Collegiate Cycling Conference
MWCCC: Midwestern Collegiate Cycling Conference
SECCC: Southeastern Collegiate Cycling Conference
NCCCC: North Central Collegiate Cycling Conference
SWCCC: Southwestern Collegiate Cycling Conference
NWCCC: Northwestern Collegiate Cycling Conference
WCCC: Western Collegiate Cycling Conference

See also
USA Cycling

External links

College sports governing bodies in the United States
Cycle racing in the United States
Cycling organizations in the United States